Ministry of Telecom and Information Technology of the State of Palestine is one of the government offices of the Palestinian administration. The Telecom and Information Technology Ministry of the State of Palestine transformed from Ministry of Telecom and Information Technology of the Palestinian National Authority, following the November 29, 2012 vote in UN over upgrade of Palestine to non-member state status. The Ministry is headed by Dr. Ishaq Sadr.

References

External links
 

Communications ministries
1994 establishments in the Palestinian territories